Miss France 2018 was the 88th edition of the Miss France pageant, held on 16 December 2017 at the M.A.CH 36 in Châteauroux, Centre-Val de Loire.

Miss France 2017 Alicia Aylies of French Guiana crowned her successor Maëva Coucke of Nord-Pas-de-Calais at the end of the event. She represented France at Miss World 2018 and Miss Universe 2019.

Results

History 

On 18 May 2017, the Miss France Organization announced that the 2018 pageant would take place at the M.A.CH 36 in Châteauroux, Centre-Val de Loire. It was the first time that the pageant took place in Châteauroux and the fourth time in the Centre-Val de Loire region.

The ceremony was broadcast on TF1, and was presented by Jean-Pierre Foucault and the national director Sylvie Tellier.

Preliminary activities 
The contestants traveled to California, United States for their preliminary travel. Then, rehearsals took place in the host city Châteauroux.

Final night 

The year's theme was "celebrations", including outfits inspired by Fête de la Musique, Bastille Day, and music festivals like Coachella. For the first time since Miss France 2004, the opening was held in national costume, with Ed Sheeran as a musical guest.

The ceremony followed this order :
 Opening with Ed Sheeran, the contestants showed their regional costumes.
 First presentation round, on the theme of the Traveling carnival.
 Second presentation round, with a 14 Juillet theme.
 Third and last presentation round inspired by Fête de la Musique.
 Carnival-themed swimsuit segment, including Miss France 2017 Alicia Aylies.
 For the first time since 2004, the contestants wore gowns in the last part of the night with all the contestants. It was inspired by Bal de la Rose in Monaco.
 Announcement of the 12 semi-finalists (for the first time in long gown instead of swimsuit). Each contestant had to do a quick introduction.
 Swimsuit segment, inspired by Coachella Valley Music and Arts Festival. This year, there were no evening gown competition with the 12 semi-finalists.
 Announcement of the 5 finalists. 
 Fashion swimsuit show on the theme of "Fête des Fleurs" (flower festival). Iris Mittenaere appeared during this round, with an outfit representing an Iris.
 Evening gown competition. Question round, the questions were submitted by internauts.
 Crowning moment.

Judges 

Iris Mittenaere, Miss France 2016 and France's second Miss Universe, and fashion designer Jean-Paul Gaultier, were co-presidents of the panel of judges.

Contestants

Placements

First round 

A jury composed of partners (internal and external) of the company Miss France pre-selects 12 young women, during an interview that took place on 13 December.

Second round 
The 50% jury and the 50% public choose the five candidates who can still be elected. A ranking ofrom 1 to 12 is established for each of the two parties.

Classement des finalistes par points :

Last round 
Only the audience can choose the winner and her runners-up by voting.

Special awards

Notes 

The median age was approximately 20 years old and the median height was 1,737m / 5 ft 8 in.

Ethnic origins
 Auvergne – Marie-Anne Halbwachs is of German origin.
 Burgundy - Mélanie Soares is of Portuguese origin.
 Champagne-Ardenne – Safiatou Guinot is of Ivorian descent through her father.
 Côte d'Azur – Julia Sidi Atman is of Algerian and Italian descent.
 Île-de-France – Lison DiMartino is of Italian and Sicilian descent through her father.
 New Caledonia – Levina Napoleon is of Polynesian, Swedish and Chinese origin from her mother's side, and Javanese and Melanesian origin from her father's side.
 Picardy – Paoulina Prylutska was born in Ukraine.
 Provence – Kleofina Pnishi was born in Kosovo.
 Reunion – Audrey Chane Pao Kan is of Chinese and Indian descent.
 Rhône-Alpes – Dalida Benaoudia is of Algerian descent.

Replacements
 Martinique – Jade Voltigeur, Miss Martinique, was disqualified due to a too big tattoo, which is against the rules of the pageant. Her first runner-up, Laura-Anaïs Abidal, took over the title.

Notes on the placements 

 The region Nord-Pas-de-Calais wins its third crown of Miss France, in only four years.
 The region Aquitaine is placed for the fourth consecutive year.
 The Reunion Island is placed for the third consecutive year.
 The regions Île-de-France, French Guiana and Languedoc-Roussillon are placed for the second consecutive year.
 The regions Martinique, Nord-Pas-de-Calais, Provence and Rhône-Alpes are placed for the first time since Miss France 2016.
 The region Champagne-Ardenne is placed for the first time since Miss France 2013. The region is also reaching its highest achievement while being third runner-up (they only made the top 5 once previously, with Christine Grégoire who was fourth runner-up in 1984). 
 The region Corsica is placed for the first time since Miss France 2011.
 The region Limousin is placed for the first time since Miss France 2010.

References

External links 

December 2017 events in France
Miss France
2017 beauty pageants